Thattungal Thirakkappadum is a 1966 Indian Tamil-language thriller film directed by J. P. Chandrababu. Savitri Ganesh, K. R. Vijaya, Shoba (credited as Baby Mahalakshmi), Chandrababu and Manohar star, while A. V. M. Rajan, Cho and M. R. R. Vasu play supporting roles. Shoba made her debut film as a child artist in this film. When the film was released, the clip of the song Kalyana Panthal Alangaram was not in the film due to a delay in the shooting and editing. In the second week, the clip was merged into the film. The film was a failure due to a weak plot.

Plot 

Shankar murders his mistress, Geetha after finding out that she has had a child with another man. Adaikalam, who is mute and an orphan is blamed for this murder. Adaikalam gets arrested by the police. Then Shankar meets his wife (the one that he had abandoned) Meenakshi, and his daughter and lives with them. When Shankar goes abroad on business, by ship, the ship explodes. Shankar feigns death after which, his insurance money is received by Meenakshi. Shankar needed that money to pay off his debts so he had pretended to be dead and made Meenakshi take the insurance money and pay his debts. Shankar and Meenakshi have a fight. While fighting, Shankar's daughter gets frightened and kills Shankar. Meenakshi is shocked and hides his body in a room. That's when Adaikalam gets released from jail. When he goes to meet Shankar, Meenakshi tries to stop him entering the room, but she cannot. When Adaikalam sees the body, he is shocked. Meenakshi pretends not to know anything about this and calls the police. When the police come, they investigate and come to know that Meenakshi killed Shankar. Meenakshi is arrested and her daughter is taken care of by Adaikalam.

Cast 
 Savitri Ganesh as Meenakshi
 K. R. Vijaya as Geetha
 Baby Mahalakshmi as Meenakshi's daughter
 J. P. Chandrababu as Adaikalam
 Manohar as Shankar
 A. V. M. Rajan as the doctor
 Cho as the lawyer
 M. R. R. Vasu as the servant

Soundtrack 
The music was composed by M. S. Viswanathan and lyrics were written by Kannadasan.

References

External links 
 

1960s Tamil-language films
1960s thriller films
1966 films
Films scored by M. S. Viswanathan
Indian black-and-white films
Indian thriller films